The Tenda line or Cuneo-Ventimiglia line, also called in , is a cross-border railway line in the Alpine regions of France and Italy, connecting the Maritime and Ligurian Alps.

The line connects Cuneo and Ventimiglia, both stations in Italy, but it passes through territory now belonging to France. This historical peculiarity is due to the fact that at the time of its design and construction, the route was located entirely within the Kingdom of Sardinia.

History

Infrastructure

Electrification

Services

Recognition

On 25 February 2021, the railway was named the winner of the tenth , a competition run by the Fondo Ambiente Italiano (FAI), due to the richness and uniqueness of the landscapes in the territories it crosses. It also ranked first in the special category Italy above 600 meters.

External links

References

Cross-border railway lines in France
Cross-border railway lines in Italy
Transport in Cuneo